Linus Karlsson (born 16 November 1999) is a Swedish ice hockey centre who is currently playing with the Abbotsford Canucks in the American Hockey League (AHL) as a prospect to the Vancouver Canucks of the National Hockey League (NHL). Karlsson was selected in the third round, 87th overall, of the 2018 NHL Entry Draft by the San Jose Sharks.

Playing career
Karlsson began playing with the Boro/Vetlanda club at different junior levels before he started playing at senior level (in the fourth tier of Swedish ice hockey) during the 2015–16 season. Karlsson signed with the Karlskrona HK organization for the 2017–18 season, and subsequently made his Swedish Hockey League debut with Karlskrona during the 2017–18 SHL season. On 25 February 2019, his NHL rights were traded to the Vancouver Canucks in exchange for Jonathan Dahlén. after a successful 2021–22 season in the SHL with Skellefteå AIK he was awarded the SHL Rookie of the Year award.

On 27 May 2022, Karlsson was signed to a two-year, entry-level contract with the Vancouver Canucks.

Career statistics

References

External links

1999 births
Living people
Abbotsford Canucks players
BIK Karlskoga players
Karlskrona HK players
People from Eksjö Municipality
San Jose Sharks draft picks
Skellefteå AIK players
Swedish ice hockey centres
Sportspeople from Jönköping County